Illegal Stills is an album released by American musician Stephen Stills on 7 May 1976. This was Stills second album on Columbia Records and his fourth solo album overall. After it was released he would start an album and tour with Neil Young. It was released on CD in 1991 (Columbia CK-34148). The album charted at number 31 in the US on release, but wasn't a critical success.

Recording 
The majority of this album was recorded in Criteria Studios over January and February 1976, with the majority of his road band from his 1975 tours. Stills experimented with adding Crosby & Nash-like harmonies by using Howard Kaylan and Mark Volman (otherwise known as Flo & Eddie). In the other studio were the Bee Gees working on their Children of the World album, to which Stills added percussion to the hit song "You Should Be Dancing." During this time Barry Gibb and Stills wrote an unreleased song together.

Songs 
The liner notes describe the songs as follows:

Side 1

"Buyin' Time" - "Written midst the 1975's Presidential placations over our economic woes. Recorded at Criteria Studios with vocals done at Caribou Ranch. Piano overdub by Stephen at Criteria."

"Midnight In Paris" - "Recorded at Criteria with Vocals at Caribou Ranch. French vocal - no expense spared and with Great Mental Torment (not the name of a group-rather a state of mind) by Stephen. Written by Veronique Sanson Stills for Donnie's song."

"Different Tongues" - "Basis recorded at Criteria with vocals at Caribou. Written in London, October 1974, after the CSNY tour, by Donnie and Stephen in their hotel room. The key change was suggested later in Miami by George Terry, Eric's guitar player. Acoustic piano by Stephen and string synthesizer arrangement by Stephen with the great Joe Vitale - we were already mixing by then. Special thanks to Jim Friedman for pulling us all together."

"Soldier" - "Another hotel song, expressing feelings had and people known for a long time. Piano, lead guitar, and synthesizer by Stephen."

"The Loner" - "Always wanted to do it. Had a song riff like 'Crossroads' but thought 'why try to write another when there is already a great song around.' Spent a lot of time with different lead guitar ideas."

Side 2

"Stateline Blues" - "A Tahoe tune. Always seem to end up with an acoustic tune on the album. Played it live on Dobro for a few months, but it sounded richer on Maybelle, the oldest D-45, with just a Dobro solo. Stephen overdubbed bass part later, as did Joe Vitale on brush drums."

"Closer to You" - "Donnie's outstanding twelve-string throughout the track sets up a simply great song."

"No Me Niegas" - "Lala had to play right on this one. We tried to get a classic latin feel and of course the holes in the percussion are as solid as the beats. Piano and synthesizer by Stephen."

"Ring of Love" - "Donnie pulled this one out of his past. Flo and Eddie worked on him the better part of an evening 'till he forgot he wasn't supposed to be having a good time singing. 'Smiracles will happen!"

"Circlin'" - "Cut three different times, this one sounds the best. Recorded at Cherokee in LA, after we had just finished all basics and vocals for the album. Just one of those nights when everyone was there. Joe Vitale played drums. Lead guitar and piano overdub is Stephen."

Artwork and packaging 
The album is noted for its creative artwork, placing Stills head on the label of moonshine jar, a pun on the album's title. A lyric sheet was also included with a description of each track.

Release 
The album charted at No. 31 on the Billboard 200, the week of 4 July 1976, during a 15-week run. It also peaked at No. 31 in Canada, and No. 54 in the UK. "Buyin' Time" was released as a single but didn't chart. Stills supported the album with a tour in November 1976.

Reception 
In a contemporary review Billboard said, "Typical laid-back Stills with usual better than average songs and instrumental work from Donnie Dacus, George Perry, Joe Vitale, Tubby Ziegler and several others. Flo and Eddie join in on vocals. For Stills fans, this LP is exactly what they expect. The only criticism might be that the artist doesn't seem to get above a fixed energy level until near the end of side two, when he swings into a Latin-flavored cut and several easy rockers. Stills is strong on the more uptempo cuts and should do more."

Critical reception was mixed. Rolling Stone did not bother to review the album, however Steve Clarke for the NME in a review praised the production work and said, "There is such a thing as the Stephen Stills sound and like Phil Spector and Brian Wilson's sound it's a big aural landscape." Clarke concluded his piece with, "Illegal Stills is a well paced album with a flowing sense of continuity totally absent from Stills and bears the marks of simply first grade rock talent." Many critics said there was not enough guitar playing from Stills, and there was too much influence from Donnie Dacus, so much so that people thought it could have been credited to both Stills and Dacus. Record Mirror, in 1976, received the album positively saying it "sounds fresh yet comfortably familiar" and complemented Stills on the production, calling it some of the "cleanest producing in sometime". They chose "Soldier' as a highlight saying it had that instant classic sound on first listen.

In 1978, Stills commented that "Nothing I tried seemed to work out right. It was just a bad time for me. I couldn't pin anything down".

Track listing

Personnel 
As listed on album sleeve.

 Stephen Stills – vocals, keyboards, guitars, bass 
 Jerry Aiello – keyboards
 Donnie Dacus – guitars, vocals
 George Terry – guitars
 George "Chocolate" Perry – bass
 Joe Vitale – drums
 Ron "Tubby" Zeigler – drums
 Joe Lala – percussion
 Howard Kaylan – vocals
 Mark Volman – vocals

Production 
 Stephen Stills – producer 
 Don Gehman – producer, recording, mixing 
 Howard Albert – recording 
 Ron Albert – recording
 Alex Sadkin – mixing, mastering
 John Berg – cover concept, design 
 Gerard Huerta – artwork, design 
 Don Hunstein – cover photography
 Tom Zimmhoff – photo of Stephen Stills
 Michael John Bowen – management

Charts

Tour 

The Stephen Stills 1976 Tour was a concert tour by American musician Stephen Stills, it was his first tour after Neil Young pulled out of The Stills-Young Band tour. This was a smaller tour in which Stills generally played acoustic for the first half, then only played as a three piece, with drums and bass for the electric/piano set. Some dates Stills played acoustic for the whole show including The Palladium date. A European tour in June 1976 was cancelled at short notice due to Stills reuniting with Neil Young. Stills was due to play Ninean Stadium, Cardiff, Wales to 40,000 fans on 5 June but pulled out at the last minute. Bob Marley replaced him.

Tour personnel
 Stephen Stills - Guitar, Piano, Vocals
 George "Chocolate" Perry - Bass
 Joe Vitale - Drums

References

Stephen Stills albums
1976 albums
Albums produced by Don Gehman
Columbia Records albums